Ardara may refer to:
Ardara, Sardinia, a comune (municipality) in the Province of Sassari in the Italian region Sardinia.
Ardara, County Donegal, a small town in County Donegal, Ireland.
Ardara Road Halt railway station was a station which served Ardara, County Donegal.
Ardara, North Huntingdon Twp., Westmoreland Co., Pennsylvania, United States, a coal mining ghost town (see List of ghost towns in Pennsylvania)